Louis Rolland Trinquesse (c.1746-1800) was a French painter.

Selected works

Drawings
Seated Woman Sewing, 1788 - National Gallery of Art, Washington D.C.
Young woman with a bowl and spoon - Courtauld Institute of Art

Paintings
An interior with two ladies and a gentleman,"Portrait of a Woman", and "Musical Amusement."

External links
http://www.artcyclopedia.com/artists/trinquesse_louis_rolland.html
http://www.artnet.com/artist/556587/louis-rolland-trinquesse.html

1746 births
1800 deaths
18th-century French painters
French male painters
18th-century French male artists